Nana Smith (born Nana Miyagi; 10 April 1971) is an American-born tennis player who played for Japan.

Career
Miyagi, a former top-15 player in doubles, played at all the Grand Slam tournaments in both singles and doubles – the Australian Open, French Open, Wimbledon and the US Open. She scored her first top-10 win in singles in 1994, over then-world No. 8, Lindsay Davenport, and also scored wins over many top-20 ranked players, including Martina Hingis. Her highest ranking in singles is 51, which she reached in February 1995. She won four singles titles on the ITF Circuit.

She had a more successful doubles career, reaching a career-high ranking of 12 in 1997, winning 10 WTA titles and an additional 31 ITF Circuit titles. Also, she reached the semifinals of the 1993 US Open with Yayuk Basuki, and scored a notable win over Serena and Venus Williams at the 1998 Australian Open, with Naoko Kijimuta.

Nana also won two medals at the 1998 Asian Games in Bangkok, gold in mixed-doubles with Satoshi Iwabuchi and bronze in women's doubles with Rika Hiraki.

WTA career finals

Singles: 1 (runner-up)

Doubles: 22 (10 titles, 12 runner-ups)

ITF Circuit finals

Singles: 11 (4–7)

Doubles: 46 (31–15)

External links
 
 

1971 births
Japanese female tennis players
Japanese people of Canadian descent
Sportspeople from Okinawa Prefecture
Tennis players from San Diego
Living people
Tennis players from Seattle
Japanese-American tennis players
American sportspeople of Canadian descent
Tennis players at the 2000 Summer Olympics
Olympic tennis players of Japan
Asian Games medalists in tennis
Tennis players at the 1990 Asian Games
Tennis players at the 1994 Asian Games
Tennis players at the 1998 Asian Games
Asian Games gold medalists for Japan
Asian Games silver medalists for Japan
Asian Games bronze medalists for Japan
Medalists at the 1990 Asian Games
Medalists at the 1994 Asian Games
Medalists at the 1998 Asian Games
American female tennis players
21st-century American women